Françoise de Brézé (ca. 1518 – 14 October 1577), Suo jure Countess of Maulévrier, was a French noblewoman and courtier.

Life

Early life
Françoise de Brézé was born in ca. 1518 as the first daughter and child of Diane de Poitiers and Louis de Brézé, 
seigneur d'Anet, Count of Maulévrier and grandson of King Charles VII by his mistress Agnès Sorel. Both of her parents served as a courtiers to King Francis I of France.

In 1538, 22/23-years-old Françoise married Robert IV de La Marck, Prince of Sedan and Duke of Bouillon.

Court career

Through her mother's high position as King Henry II's mistress, Françoise was appointed Première dame d'honneur to Queen Catherine de' Medici. Despite  her chief attendant being the daughter her husband's mistress, Queen Catherine didn’t seem to have personally disliked Françoise. As Première dame d'honneur, Françoise supervised the female courtiers, was in control the household's budget, ordered necessary purchases, organized the annual accounts and staff list, and introducing those seeking audience with the Queen.

From 1553, however, she would in practice have been absent from court attending to her duties as regent of Sedan and dame d'atour Madeleine Buonaiuti would have functioned as Première dame d'honneur accordance with court protocol. Françoise lost her office as Première dame d'honneur upon King Henry's death, but when Catherine became regent in 1560, Françoise was given a position as lady-in-waiting in the Queen Mother's household, which she kept until 1570.

Regent
During her husband's war imprisonment in the Siege of Metz (1553–56) and during the minority of their son Henri Robert (1556–59), Françoise was the capable ruler of the Principality of Sedan. She reportedly kept the finances of Sedan in good accounts and instigated several much needed public works, including Sedan Hospice and Neuve de l'Horloge, the first paved street in the city which still exists today. In 1577, the dead, 62-years-old Princess  was buried near her mother-in-law's tomb in the necropolis of the Counts of Dreux, Saint-Yved de Braine.

Issue
She had the following children with Robert IV de La Marck:
Henri Robert (1539–1574): Succeeded his father as Duke of Bouillon and Prince of Sedan. Married Françoise de Bourbon, daughter of Louis, Duke of Montpensier.
Charles Robert (1541–1622): Succeeded his Mother as Count of Maulévrier.
Christian: Died young.
Antoinette (1542–1591), married Henri I de Montmorency through Antoinette, Françoise is a ancestor of Hortense Mancini and substantially the current Prince of Monaco. 
Guillemette (1543–1544)
Diane (born 1544): Named after her maternal grandmother. Married 1) Jacques de Clèves, duc de Nevers, 2) Henri de Clermont, 3) Jean Babou, Count of Sagonne.
Guillemette (1545–1592): Married John III, Count of Ligny.
Françoise (born 1547): Became an abbess.
Catherine (born 1548): Married Jacques de Harlay, seigneur de Champvallon.

References

Bibliography

 Alain Sartelet, La Principauté de Sedan, Éditions Terres Ardennaises, 1991, 180 p., p. 11–12.

1515 births
1577 deaths
16th-century French people
French ladies-in-waiting
Francoise
Francoise
Burials at the Abbey of Saint-Yved de Braine
Governesses to the Children of France
Household of Catherine de' Medici
16th-century women rulers
Court of Francis I of France
People of the French Wars of Religion